Iraq competed at the 2022 World Aquatics Championships in Budapest, Hungary from 14 July to 30 July.

Swimming

Iraq entered two swimmers.

Men

References

Nations at the 2022 World Aquatics Championships
Iraq at the World Aquatics Championships
2022 in Iraqi sport